The Poinsett Lumber and Manufacturing Company Manager's House, also known locally as the Singer Mansion, is a historic house at 512 Poinsett Avenue in Trumann, Arkansas.  It is a single-story structure, with a varied roof line, and multiple exterior sheathing materials, including brick and stucco with false half-timbering typical of the Tudor Revival style, and recently applied modern siding.  The house was designed by Edwin B. Phillips and built in 1935 for the Poinsett Lumber Company to house its senior on-site manager.  It is, despite the modern siding, the only Tudor Revival building in Trumann, and the only surviving residence associated with the Poinsett Lumber Company, a major area employer in the first half of the 20th century.

The house was listed on the National Register of Historic Places in 2010.

See also
National Register of Historic Places listings in Poinsett County, Arkansas

References

Houses on the National Register of Historic Places in Arkansas
Tudor Revival architecture in Arkansas
Houses completed in 1934
Houses in Poinsett County, Arkansas
National Register of Historic Places in Poinsett County, Arkansas
1934 establishments in Arkansas